Jürgen Holtz (10 August 193221 June 2020) was a German actor on stage and in film, and an artist and author.  On stage he played leading roles in East Berlin, including with the Berliner Ensemble, and from 1983 in the West, in both classics such as Shakespeare and Brecht, whose Galileo he played at age 86, and contemporary theatre, such as the title role in the premiere of Moritz Tassow by Peter Hacks. In film, he played leading roles such as Egon Schultz in Ari Folman's Made in Israel. He received several awards including the Theaterpreis Berlin and the Konrad Wolf Prize.

Life 
He returned to Berlin, hoping to find his parents. With other students, he left for East Berlin in 1949 when the director was fired; there he went to boarding schools in Döllnkrug and Himmelpfort, achieving the Abitur in 1952. Holtz studied acting at the Deutsches Theaterinstitut in Weimar from 1952 and at the Theaterhochschule Leipzig from 1953, graduating in 1955. His first engagements were in Erfurt (1955–1957), Brandenburg an der Havel (1957–1960), and Greifswald (1960 to 1964). He then performed at the Volksbühne am Rosa-Luxemburg-Platz in East Berlin, and from 1966 to 1974 at the Deutsches Theater there.

From 1974, Holtz was a member of the Berliner Ensemble. In 1983, he remained in West Germany after a guest performance, working at the Theater Bochum and the Schauspiel Frankfurt. From 1995, he performed at the Deutsches Theater Berlin again, and from 2000 as a guest at the Nationaltheater Mannheim. He often worked in radio, film and television.

At age 86, Holtz performed from January 2019 the title role in Brecht's Leben des Galilei, adapted by Frank Castorf for the Berliner Ensemble to a six-hour event; he sometimes appeared naked.

Holtz's paintings have been shown in exhibitions, including at the Bernet Bertram gallery in Berlin in 2020. He wrote an autobiography, He, Geist! Wo geht die Reise hin? Reden. Einreden. Widerreden, published in 2015.

Holtz died of cancer in Berlin on 21 June 2020.

Film and television

Writings 
 Jürgen Holtz: He, Geist! Wo geht die Reise hin? Reden. Einreden. Widerreden. in: Theater der Zeit, Berlin 2015, . (Autobiography)

Exhibitions 
 2017: Jürgen Holtz. Zeichnungen, Aquarelle, Schriftfiguren (2017). Galerie Bernet Bertram, Berlin
 2020: Kaspar, Puppe, Krokodil. Satiren, Karikaturen, Abstraktionen. Einzelausstellung 13. Juni bis 29. August 2020, Galerie Bernet Bertram, Berlin

Awards 
 1990: Adolf Grimme Prize
 1993:  (Theater heute)
 1993: Gertrud-Eysoldt-Ring
 2004: Hessischer Kulturpreis
 2013: Theaterpreis Berlin
 2014: Konrad Wolf Prize

References

External links 
 
 
 
 Jürgen Holtz, munzinger.de

1932 births
2020 deaths
Theaterhochschule Leipzig alumni
20th-century German male actors
21st-century German male actors
Deaths from cancer in Germany
German male film actors
Male actors from Berlin